Serving Through Science was "the first regular science-related network series" and the first educational television series broadcast in the United States.

The series premiered on the DuMont Television Network in May 1945, and was shown Tuesdays at 9 pm ET.  The weekly program starred Dr. Miller McClintock showing short films produced by Encyclopædia Britannica, and was sponsored by U. S. Rubber.

The last show aired May 27, 1947.

The series' name was also a slogan used by the sponsor in its advertising.

See also
 List of programs broadcast by the DuMont Television Network
 List of surviving DuMont Television Network broadcasts
 1946-47 United States network television schedule

References and sources
References

Sources
David Weinstein, The Forgotten Network: DuMont and the Birth of American Television (Philadelphia: Temple University Press, 2004) 
Alex McNeil, Total Television, Fourth edition (New York: Penguin Books, 1980) 
Tim Brooks and Earle Marsh, The Complete Directory to Prime Time Network TV Shows, Third edition (New York: Ballantine Books, 1964) 

DuMont Television Network original programming
1946 American television series debuts
1947 American television series endings
Science education television series
English-language television shows
Black-and-white American television shows